This is a list of significant historic properties in Greater Sudbury, Ontario. The Sudbury Municipal Heritage Committee (SMHC) listed 64 sites in a Heritage Position Paper as part of its new Downtown Sudbury Master Plan in April 2011.

SMHC List

Lost Buildings and Structures

See also
 List of tallest buildings in Greater Sudbury

References

External links
 History of Sudbury at Greater Sudbury Heritage Museums
 History Hikes - Downtown
 Inventory and Guide to Historic Buildings in Sudbury

 List historic places
Greater Sudbury